The 2012–13 Slovenian Women's Cup, held from August 12, 2012 to May 29, 2013, was the 14th edition of the Slovenian women's football national cup. It was contested by the nine teams in the 2012–13 Slovenian top league and ŽNK Izola.

The defending champions ŽNK Pomurje again defeated ŽNK Rudar Škale in the final, held in Koper, to win its fourth title.

Results

Preliminary round

Final rounds

Source: NZS.si

Final

Top scorers

References

Cup women
Women's football competitions in Slovenia
Slovenia